Sherrill Busby (March 30, 1914 – June 7, 1960) was an American football end for the Brooklyn Dodgers of the National Football League (NFL).

A native of Montgomery, Alabama, he played college football for Troy Teachers College. After the 1939 season, he was selected by the Associated Press as a first-team player on its Little All-America team and its All-Southern Intercollegiate Athletic Association team. He played professional football in the National Football League (NFL) for the Brooklyn Dodgers during the 1940 season. He appeared in three games for the Dodgers as a defensive end.

References

1914 births
1960 deaths
Brooklyn Dodgers (NFL) players
Troy Trojans football players
Players of American football from Alabama